The 1980 United States presidential election in Ohio took place on November 4, 1980. All 50 states and The District of Columbia were part of the 1980 United States presidential election. State voters chose 25 electors to the Electoral College, who voted for president and vice president.

Because of Ohio's long-time bellwether status, Carter and Reagan campaigned heavily in the state from the start of the presidential primaries. At the beginning of the campaign, it was clear that inflation and the Iranian hostage crisis were cutting heavily into Carter's popularity in the industrial areas of the state, although Reagan was not viewed warmly by the state's electorate either.

Despite the coldness with which the incumbent President was received on his first visit to Columbus, Carter did gain a critical victory over challenger Ted Kennedy in Ohio's presidential primary on June 4, owing to his dominance of Ohio's heavily Appalachian rural counties plus the endorsement of both Buckeye State Senator John Glenn and Cleveland's Plain Dealer newspaper.

In the earliest polls after the nominations were settled, Reagan was slightly ahead of Carter, and from midsummer the GOP nominee targeted Ohio as part of his strategy of appealing to industrial workers in the Northeast and Great Lakes region. Ohio gained further attention from a court case that allowed independent candidate and former Republican rival to Reagan John B. Anderson to be on the state's ballot, but Reagan continued his strategy of seeking the support of Ohio's industrial workers during the remainder of the summer. However, after the challenger being ahead for the first half of the fall – although never by an irreversible margin – by mid-October Ohio was seen as close because Reagan was not gaining so much support from industrial workers as he had hoped in August, with voters simply debating “which candidate they liked least”. However, by the beginning of November, Ohio was viewed as the most problematic of the three “key” Midwestern states for Carter's re-election battle, as he was only seventy-five thousand votes ahead in Cuyahoga County, which he had won by over 93,000 votes in his 11,000-vote statewide triumph four years previously. The Equal Rights Amendment and abortion were also seen as severely handicapping Carter in the Southern-leaning Appalachian counties where he had done well in 1976.

Ohio was won by former California Governor Ronald Reagan (R) by 11%. Ohio voted very close to the nation for both Carter and Reagan, although Anderson was 0.7% below his national percentage. Reagan was the first Republican since Dwight D. Eisenhower in 1956 to carry heavily populated Lucas County.

Results

Results by county

See also
 United States presidential elections in Ohio

Notes

References

Ohio
1980
1980 Ohio elections